The 2016 STRABAG Challenger Open was a professional tennis tournament played on clay courts. It was the tenth edition of the tournament which was part of the 2016 ATP Challenger Tour. It took place at the TC EMPIRE in Trnava, Slovakia from 8 to 14 August 2016.

Singles main-draw entrants

Seeds

 1 Rankings are as of August 1, 2016.

Other entrants
The following players received wildcards into the singles main draw:
  Jürgen Melzer
  Martin Blaško
  Patrik Fabian
  Dominik Šproch

The following player received entry into the singles main draw with a protected ranking:
  Fabiano de Paula

The following player received entry as an alternate:
  Riccardo Bellotti

The following players received entry from the qualifying draw:
  Geoffrey Blancaneaux
  Markus Eriksson
  Hubert Hurkacz
  Roman Jebavý

Champions

Singles

  Steve Darcis def.  Jordi Samper-Montaña, 6–3, 6–4

Doubles

  Sander Gillé /  Joran Vliegen def.  Tomasz Bednarek /  Roman Jebavý, 6–2, 7–5

External links
Official Website

STRABAG Challenger Open
STRABAG Challenger Open
STRABAG Challenger Open